Larry Cipa (born October 5, 1951) is a former American football quarterback. He played college football for the Michigan Wolverines from 1971 to 1973 and professional football for the New Orleans Saints from 1974 to 1975.

Early years
Born in Detroit, Michigan, Cipa attended Archbishop McNicholas High School in Cincinnati, Ohio, before enrolling at the University of Michigan.

University of Michigan
Cipa played at the quarterback position for the Michigan Wolverines football team from 1971 to 1973.  He was a backup to Dennis Franklin in 1972 and 1973, starting only one game at quarterback.  During his time at Michigan, Cipa appeared in 19 games and completed 24 of 71 passes for 360 yards, five interceptions, and three touchdowns.

Professional football
Cipa was selected by the New Orleans Saints in the 15th round (373rd overall pick) of the 1974 NFL Draft. He played for the Saints from 1974 to 1975, appearing in 8 games, three of them as the team's starting quarterback. He appeared in his first game as a starter in December 1974 after injuries to Archie Manning and Bobby Scott.

In July 1976, he was traded to the Tampa Bay Buccaneers.  Less than a week later, the Buccaneers placed him on waivers after he failed a physical due to arthritis of the knee.

References

1951 births
Living people
American football quarterbacks
Michigan Wolverines football players
New Orleans Saints players
Players of American football from Detroit
Players of American football from Cincinnati